Al-Rabwah is a village in Syria in the Homs District, Homs Governorate. According to the Syria Central Bureau of Statistics, Al-Rabwah had a population of 2,732 in the 2004 census.

References

Populated places in Homs District